The Arizona State Schools for the Deaf and the Blind (ASDB) is an Arizona state agency, with its administrative headquarters in Tucson. It operates three schools for the deaf and blind, and five regional cooperatives throughout the state:
 Phoenix Day School for the Deaf-Phoenix Campus (PDSD)
 Arizona School for the Deaf-Tucson Campus (ASD)
 Arizona School for the Blind-Tucson Campus (ASB)
 Regional Cooperatives: These regional cooperatives are voluntary partnerships between public education agencies (school districts and charter schools) throughout the state and ASDB. The Cooperative staff serve students and families in five regions: North Central, Eastern Highlands, Desert Valleys, Southwest and Southeast. School staff and the Cooperative staff work together in local schools to promote success for students who are deaf, hard of hearing, blind or visually impaired.

History
The first Arizona state legislature in 1912 enacted a provision forming the agency. Classes began in October 1912 with 19 deaf students on a converted residence on the campus of the University of Arizona in Tucson. The first principal was Henry C. White, appointed by Arizona's first governor, George W. P. Hunt. Today, the school is a public corporation operated by a board of directors.

In May 2016, the ASDB Board of Directors announced Annette Reichman as the next ASDB Superintendent. She is the first deaf and visually impaired Superintendent in ASDB's 104 year old history. Due to the certification requirements for faculty, in 2017 the school system had a lack of teachers and it was making efforts to recruit more.

Campuses
The Tucson campus has two dormitories for students.

Due to parents in the Phoenix metropolitan area wanting a local deaf campus, in 1967 ADSB opened its Phoenix campus, Phoenix Day School for the Deaf (PDSD). On a December 1, 2016, visit of Paul Boyer to PDSD, students expressed that they wanted a dormitory.

References

External links

 Official website

Public middle schools in Arizona
Public high schools in Arizona
Public elementary schools in Arizona
Public K-12 schools in the United States
Boarding schools in Arizona
Schools for the blind in the United States
Schools for the deaf in the United States
Public boarding schools in the United States
Schools in Tucson, Arizona
Schools in Phoenix, Arizona